The Ministry of the Interior and Local Government (MILG), also known as the Ministry of Local Government (MLG), is the regional executive department of the Bangsamoro Autonomous Region in Muslim Mindanao (BARMM) responsible for local governance.

History
The Ministry of Local Government of Bangsamoro was established as a regional office of the Philippine national government's Department of the Interior and Local Government Autonomous Region in Muslim Mindanao back when the BARMM's predecessor, the Autonomous Region in Muslim Mindanao (ARMM), was still extant. Philippine President Corazon Aquino issued on October 12, 1990 Executive Order 425, which placed various line agencies and offices of the national government covering the ARMM under the autonomous region's control and supervision, including the government body dealing with local government.

When the ARMM was succeeded by the Bangsamoro Autonomous Region in Muslim Mindanao (BARMM) in 2019, the regional departments of the former ARMM were reconfigured into ministries of Bangsamoro. DILG-ARMM became the Ministry of Local Government, and Naguib Sinarimbo was appointed on February 26, 2019 by interim Chief Minister Murad Ebrahim as the newly reconfigured Bangsamoro department's first minister.

Function
The ministry's function is to promote and maintain security in Bangsamoro's constituent local government units (LGUs) as well as to aid the chief minister in the general supervision of the governance of the region's LGUs immediate local government.

Ministers

References

Interior and Local Government
Bangsamoro